"One Shot" is a song by American rapper YoungBoy Never Broke Again, featuring fellow American rapper Lil Baby. The song was released on June 18, 2020, as the lead single from the Road to Fast 9 mixtape for F9, the ninth film in the Fast & Furious franchise. Two different videos were released for the song, with the second one premiering on July 29, 2020.

Background
"One Shot" is the first release off the Road to Fast 9 mixtape. The mixtape, which serves as the lead up to the official soundtrack of F9, will feature music inspired by the film.

Composition and lyrics
"One Shot" is a "motivational anthem", with the rappers trading bars about "flexin" their riches and chasing the dream, exclaiming how when they get "one shot", they have to take it.

Music video 
The music video was written and directed by AJ Bleyer, and released on July 29, 2020. The video, filmed in Los Angeles over two days, follows NBA YoungBoy through a drifting chase scene. At the end of the video, he escapes his pursuers in a black helicopter.

Critical reception
Nia Groce of Hypebeast described the track as "braggadocious" and said NBA YoungBoy and Lil Baby's musical offering gives a taste of the action and high energy to come from F9.

Charts

Certifications

References

2020 singles
2020 songs
YoungBoy Never Broke Again songs
Songs written by YoungBoy Never Broke Again
Lil Baby songs
Songs written by Lil Baby
Fast & Furious music